Alphinellus gibbicollis is a species of longhorn beetles of the subfamily Lamiinae. It was described by Bates in 1881, and is known from Guatemala.

References

Beetles described in 1881
Endemic fauna of Guatemala
Acanthocinini